Uwe Hartenberger (born 1 February 1968) is a German former professional footballer who works as head coach of SC Idar-Oberstein.

References

External links 
 
 
 
In conversation with Uwe Hartenberger 
Rhein-Zeitung Tag 
Merkurist.de Tag 
Trierischer Volksfreund Tag 
Unser Ex-Spieler Uwe Hartenberger ist heute 49 Jahre alt geworden 

Living people
1968 births
German footballers
Association football forwards
SV Darmstadt 98 players
FSV Zwickau players
VfL Osnabrück players
Reading F.C. players
KFC Uerdingen 05 players
SV Waldhof Mannheim players
SV Eintracht Trier 05 players
German football managers
German expatriate footballers
German expatriate sportspeople in England
Expatriate footballers in England